Knud Leonard Knudsen (6 September 1879 – 28 April 1954) was a Norwegian gymnast who competed in the 1912 Summer Olympics.

He was part of the Norwegian team, which won the gold medal in the gymnastics men's team, free system event. He was born in Ålesund and died in Bergen, and represented Bergens TF.

References

1879 births
1954 deaths
Norwegian male artistic gymnasts
Gymnasts at the 1912 Summer Olympics
Olympic gymnasts of Norway
Olympic gold medalists for Norway
Sportspeople from Ålesund
Olympic medalists in gymnastics

Medalists at the 1912 Summer Olympics
20th-century Norwegian people